Grechnevo is a rural locality (a village) in Pokrovskoye Rural Settlement, Chagodoshchensky District, Vologda Oblast, Russia. The population was 1 as of 2002.

Geography 
Selishche is the nearest rural locality.

References 

Rural localities in Chagodoshchensky District